Shahab Uddin Khan (born 1 January 1965) is a Pakistani politician who had been a member of the National Assembly of Pakistan, from June 2013 to May 2018.

Early life

He was born on 1 January 1965.

Political career
Khan ran for the seat of the National Assembly of Pakistan as an independent candidate from Constituency NA-44 (Tribal Area-IX) in 2002 Pakistani general election but was unsuccessful. He secured only 8,465 votes and lost the seat to an independent candidate Haroon Rashid.

Khan ran for the seat of National Assembly as an independent candidate from Constituency NA-44 (Tribal Area-IX) in 2008 Pakistani general election but was unsuccessful. He secured only 5,203 votes and lost the seat to independent candidate Akhunzada Chattan.

He was elected to the National Assembly as a candidate of Pakistan Muslim League (N) from Constituency NA-44 (Tribal Area-IX) in 2013 Pakistani general election. He received 15,114 votes and defeated Sardar Khan, a candidate of Jamaat-e-Islami Pakistan.

References

Living people
Pakistan Muslim League (N) politicians
Pashtun people
Pakistani MNAs 2013–2018
People from Khyber Pakhtunkhwa
1965 births